Ado Isah Gwanja (born 22 January 1990) is a Nigerian singer and actor in the Northern Nigerian film industry known as Kannywood.  Gwanja is a well-known singer whose his songs are very popular especially among women and youths in Northern Nigeria.

Career 
Gwanja first appeared in films in 2017, but spent a lot of time in the music industry before he started acting. Gwanja is often better known in music than in film. Gwanja specializes in his songs for women, he is invited to festivals where he sings his songs. Gwanja has named former Hausa singer Aminu Mai Dawayya as his mentor.

Some of Gwanja's most popular songs are Kujerar Tsakar Gida, Mamar-Mamar, Ɗakin Baƙuwa, Asha Rawa-rawa, Kilu ta Ja Bau, Kidan Mata, Warr, Chass, Luwai, and etc.

Albums 
These are the Gwanja's albums;

Filmography

Awards
Gwanja has received numerous awards from individuals and organisations. Among the major awards received by Gwanja was the award given by Nigerian first lady Aisha Buhari. Other awards includes;

Personal life
Ado Gwanja's Father is a Hausa man from Kano and his mother is from Shuwa Arabia Ethnicity from Borno State. Gwanja is a Muslim, he is married with one daughter.

See also 
 List of Nigerian musicians
 List of Hausa people

References 

1990 births
Nigerian male film actors
Hausa-language mass media
Living people
People from Kano
Male actors in Hausa cinema
21st-century Nigerian male actors
Nigerian male television actors
Nigerian male singers
Kannywood actors